Egeraracsa is a village in Zala County, Hungary.
It's located near the lake Kis-Balaton.

References

External links 
 Street map 

Populated places in Zala County